Ventadour may refer to:

Family name 
 Duke of Ventadour, a noble title in the peerage of France
 Bernart de Ventadorn, a French troubadour of the 12th century
 Bernard de Ventadour, a bishop of Puy-en-Velay, France, 1251–1255
 Maria de Ventadorn, a French trobairitz from the end of the 12th century
 Guy de Ventadour, a bishop of Vabres, France, 1349–1352

Castles
Château de Ventadour, in Moustier-Ventadour, Corrèze, France
Château de Ventadour (Ardèche), in Meyras, Ardèche, France

Places
Lake Ventadour (La Tuque), La Tuque, Mauricie, Quebec, Canada
Ventadour Lake (Ventadour River), Jamésie, Nord-du-Québec, Québec, Canada
Ventadour River, Eeyou Istchee Baie-James, Quebec, Canada